Knud Vældgaard Kristensen is (born June 7, 1953 in Farsø) is a Danish mason and politician, and he was son of Åge Kristensen and Inge Kristensen. He a member of Danish party Det Konservative Folkeparti. He is currently retired from politics.

Kristensen became a mason in 1973 and has been independent of own masonry and construction business since 1975 which he founded. It is called Hornum Murer- og Entreprenørforretning (English: Hornum masonry and contracting business).

He was a councilor in Aars Municipality from 1986–2006, in the period 1998-2001 as deputy mayor and from 2002–2006 as mayor. In 2006, he was elected municipal council in Vesthimmerland Municipality, but did not become mayor. In 2006 he became Deputy Chairman of Danish Construction in the Region of North Jutland Region and in 2007 he became president. Knud Kristensen is his party's labor, housing, animal welfare and food rapporteur and chairman of the Parliament's Labor Market Committee. He was a mayor candidate for Conservative in the municipal elections in 2010, and was elected Mayor with the support of Venstre at the constitution. He then resigned from the parliament. He ran for mayor in the 2017 Municipality election but lost it to Per Bach Laursen. The 29 January 2018 he retired from the city council and politics, because of health reasons, though he did not reject a future comeback.

References

1953 births
Living people
Conservative People's Party (Denmark) politicians
People from Vesthimmerland Municipality